The 1959 Scottish League Cup final was a football match played on 24 October 1959 at Hampden Park in Glasgow and was the final of the 14th Scottish League Cup competition. The final was contested by Hearts, who had won the previous year's final, and Third Lanark. Third Lanark led 1–0 at half time thanks to an early goal by Joe McInnes, but Hearts turned things around and won 2–1 to retain the cup thanks to second half goals by Johnny Hamilton and Alex Young. Hearts later completed a League and League Cup double – the only non Old Firm side to achieve such a double.

Match details

References

External links
 Soccerbase
 London Hearts

1959
League Cup Final
Heart of Midlothian F.C. matches
Third Lanark A.C. matches
1950s in Glasgow
October 1959 sports events in the United Kingdom